AM-1235 (1-(5-fluoropentyl)-3-(naphthalen-1-oyl)-6-nitroindole) is a drug that acts as a potent and reasonably selective agonist for the cannabinoid receptor CB1.

Pharmacology

Pharmacodynamics
AM-1235 is a cannabinoid receptor agonist with Ki of 1.5 nM at CB1 compared to 20.4 nM at CB2. While the 6-nitro substitution on the indole ring reduces affinity for both CB1 and CB2 relative to the unsubstituted parent compound AM-2201, CB2 affinity is reduced much more, resulting in a CB1 selectivity of around 13 times. This is in contrast to other related compounds such as AM-1221 where a 6-nitro substitution instead confers significant selectivity for CB2.

Pharmacokinetics

AM-1235 metabolism differs only slightly from that of JWH-018. AM-1235 N-dealkylation produces fluoropentane instead of pentane (or plain alkanes in general). It has been speculated that the fluoropentane might function as an alkylating agent or is further metabolized into toxic fluoroacetic acid. This is not true since fluoroalkanes do not act as alkylating agents under normal conditions and uneven fluoroalkane chains metabolize into substantially less toxic fluoropropanoic acid.

Legal status
In the United States, all CB1 receptor agonists of the 3-(1-naphthoyl)indole class such as AM-1235 are Schedule I Controlled Substances.

See also
 AM-694
 AM-906
 AM-2232
 AM-2233
 AM-2389
 JWH-018
 List of AM cannabinoids
 List of JWH cannabinoids
 O-1812
 THJ-2201

References

Designer drugs
Naphthoylindoles
Organofluorides
AM cannabinoids
Nitro compounds
CB1 receptor agonists
CB2 receptor agonists